The 2014–15 Magyar Kupa, known as  for sponsorship reasons, was the 57th edition of the tournament.

Final four
The final four will be held on 25 and 26 April 2015 at the Lauber Dezső Sportcsarnok in Pécs.

Semi-finals

Third place

Final

Final standings

See also
 2014–15 Nemzeti Bajnokság I

References

External links
 Hungarian Handball Federaration 

Magyar Kupa
Magyar Kupa
Handball in Hungary